The Global Basketball Association (GBA) was a professional basketball minor league based in the United States. The majority of the league's franchises were based in the Southern United States, with the remaining teams located in the Midwest. The league announced plans for franchises in European cities that never materialized. The league began play in 1991 and lasted one and a half seasons before folding in December 1992.

History
When the league was announced in 1991, league officials said there would be franchises around the world, hence the name "Global Basketball Association" (GBA). The league was owned and founded by Ted Stepien, the owner of the Cleveland Cavaliers from 1980 to 1983. Two international teams were announced: Tallinn, Soviet Union (now Estonia) and San Marino. The team from the Soviet Union was KK Kalev, which was a professional basketball team founded in 1920. The four American teams announced were Greensboro, North Carolina; Raleigh, North Carolina; Nashville, Tennessee and Greenville, South Carolina. Vilvoorde, Belgium and Évry, France were later awarded GBA franchises.

Mike Storen, who served as commissioner of the American Basketball Association from 1973 to 1975, was named commissioner of the GBA. The league announced a 64-game schedule in from November 1991 to March 1992, followed by a playoff for the league championship. To distinguish itself from other basketball leagues, the GBA used a white basketball, which was manufactured by MacGregor.

In May 1991, the GBA awarded a charter franchise to Huntsville, Alabama. The GBA merged Pro Basketball USA, another fledgling basketball minor league, in August 1991. The GBA adopted six of Pro Basketball USA's franchises: the Albany Sharp Shooters, the Louisville Shooters, the Memphis HotShots, the Fayetteville Flyers, the Mid-Michigan Great Lakers and the Wichita Outlaws.

The GBA draft was held on August 3, 1991 in Atlanta, Georgia. It was broken-up into three rounds. The first found was the territorial round where teams were limited to selecting players within a 100-mile radius. In the second round, teams could only draft free agents. The third and final round was the collegiate draft, where teams could pick players from colleges across the United States. The Greensboro City Gaters selected Keith Gatlin with the first overall pick in the draft.

By the start of the 1991–92 season in November 1991, the GBA only had franchises based in the United States. League officials said the international teams would begin play in the 1992–93 season. The Mid-Michigan Great Lakers let people attend the first few games for free, which attracted around 3,000 attendees per game. When the Great Lakers started charging for tickets, the team averaged 200 attendees. The Music City Jammers were last in attendance, averaging 300 people per game. They played a game on February 2, 1992 at the 11,000 seat Nashville Municipal Auditorium, which had a total attendance (including the players, referees and statisticians) of 136.

The Louisville Shooters in October 1991 announced plans for a $125,000 to $175,000 marketing campaign to advertise the GBA's inaugural season. The firm Bridgemon, James & Shawver Advertising Inc.—who also worked on marketing for the Louisville Redbirds professional baseball team—was contracted to run the campaign which consisted of newspaper ads, television and radio ads and a 30-minute infomercial on WAVE (TV). By February 1992, team owner Jim Tilton told Business First-Louisville the Shooters were facing "a pretty heavy loss" and he was seeking a new line of credit to keep the team afloat. The team had sold 150 season tickets and were averaging 2,250 attendees per game. A deal to sell the Shooters to an ownership group led by David Gleason fell through. By mid-March 1992, the Shooters had their telephone service shut off for failed payment. On March 31, 1992, the office furniture at the team's headquarters was repossessed. The team also had to forfeit their first round playoff series against the Mid-Michigan Great Lakers due to failure to pay rent on their home venue, Louisville Gardens. As of April 1992, the Shooters owed $23,000 in back rent to the Louisville Gardens owners.

After the 1991–92 season, GBA commissioner Mike Storen announced he was stepping away from the league to focus on his sports marketing business.

David Gleason, who attempted to purchase the Louisville Shooters in February 1992, eventually purchased the franchise from Jim Tilton. Gleason said the purchase did not include the legal obligation for $300,000 in outstanding debts owed by Tilton, however, Gleason still had to pay the debts as he wanted his debtors services. He had to settle his account with Bridgemon, James & Shawver Advertising Inc. before they would agree to continue working for the team. When they did settle the debt, the advertising firm only agreed to work on an hourly rate and would no longer let debts accrue. Gleason came to an agreement that let him continue to use Louisville Gardens as the team's home venue. The Shooters folded after three games into the 1992–93 season. The league itself disbanded in December 1992.

Teams

→ denotes that a team was relocated and/or renamed, (YEAR) denotes team never played
Albany Sharp Shooters (1991–92) → SouthGA Blues (1992)
Cedar Rapids Sharpshooters (1992)
Évry, France (1991)
Fayetteville Flyers (1991–92)
Greensboro Triad (1991) → Greensboro City Gaters (1991–92)
Greenville Spinners (1991–92)
Huntsville Lasers (1991–92)
Kalev Tallinn (1991)
Louisville Shooters (1991–92)
Memphis HotShots (1991–92) → Pensacola HotShots (1992)
Mid-Michigan Great Lakers (1991–92)
Mississippi Coast Sharks (1992)
Music City Jammers (1991–92) → Jackson Jammers (1992)
Raleigh Bullfrogs (1991–92)
San Marino (1991)
Vilvoorde, Belgium (1992)
Wichita Outlaws (1991–92)

Venues and locations

Season standings

1991–92 season

1991–92 playoffs
Bracket

Finals game-by-game results
Greenville 128, Music City 126
Music City 100, Greenville 94
Greenville 114, Music City 103
Music City 103, Greenville 101
Music City 103, Greenville 100
Music City 106, Greenville 104

1992–93 season

Note: Louisville disbanded after three games, the GBA disbanded in December 1992

Award winners
GBA All-Star Game Most Valuable Player
Lloyd Daniels, Greensboro City Gaters
GBA All-League Team, 1991–92
John Crotty, Greenville Spinners
Reggie Fox, Mid-Michigan Great Lakers
Willie McDuffie, Greenville Spinners
Danny Pearson, Greenville Spinners
Lloyd Daniels, Greensboro City Gaters
Mike Ratliff, Huntsville Lasers
Joey Wright, Memphis/Pensacola HotShots
Alfredrick Hughes, Louisville Shooters
Jerome Harmon, Louisville Shooters
GBA All-Defensive Team, 1991–92
David Harris, Huntsville Lasers
Sean Gay, Greensboro City Gaters
James Martin, Fayetteville Flyers
Paris McCurdy, Mid-Michigan Great Lakers
Lorenzo Williams, Fayetteville Flyers

References

Sports leagues established in 1991
Organizations disestablished in 1992
Defunct basketball leagues in the United States
1991 establishments in the United States
1992 disestablishments in the United States